He Learned About Women is a 1933 American pre-Code comedy film directed by Lloyd Corrigan and written by Lloyd Corrigan, Harlan Thompson and Ray Harris. The film stars Stuart Erwin, Susan Fleming, Alison Skipworth, Gordon Westcott, Grant Mitchell, and Sidney Toler. The film was released on November 4, 1932, by Paramount Pictures.

Plot
"Story of youth who comes into fortune and prepares to see life."

"Alison Skipworth joins the cast as a would be swindler who doesn't quite succeed as she plans"

"a childlike playboy inherits the family fortune and gets himself a worldly butler who teaches him how to behave in a manner befitting his wealth and social station"

"A debonair butler shows his wealthy master how to be a sophisticated man of the world"

"When hermit Peter Potter Kendall II inherits fifty million dollars, his attorney, James Drake, appoints Peter's valet, J. F. Wilson, to teach Peter about the world, then leaves for Europe...."

Cast
Stuart Erwin as Peter Potter Kendall II
Susan Fleming as Joan Allen
Alison Skipworth as Mme. Vivienne Pompadour
Gordon Westcott as Eddie Clifford
Grant Mitchell as Appleby
Sidney Toler as Wilson
Tom Ricketts as Augus
Claude King as Drake
Gertrude Norman
Gertrude Messenger
Geneva Mitchell
Dorothy Granger
Irving Bacon as Stage Door Man

References

External links
 
 
 

1932 films
American comedy films
1932 comedy films
Paramount Pictures films
Films directed by Lloyd Corrigan
American black-and-white films
1930s English-language films
1930s American films